The Ace was an American-assembled car made in Ypsilanti, Michigan by the Apex Motor Car Company, which was reorganized as the Apex Motor Corporation in 1921.  The initial batch of cars assembled were sent to Seattle, Washington dealer FE Earnest, who had the idea for the Ace after he was unable to secure a steady supply of new cars for his dealership.

The most interesting feature of the Ace was the Guy Disc-Valve motor, created by engineer Fred M Guy, and Otto  W. Heinz. Initially, it was prepared as a four-cylinder engine for production in the Hackett, but the company folded before it was ready.

In April, 1921, Guy and Heinz left the Apex Motor Corporation, obviously with the support of Apex, to found the Guy Disc Valve Motor Co. in Ypsilanti. In mid-1921, a Model H tourer with a conventional Herschell-Spillman straight-6 was added, with a selling price $2,000. The man at the helm at Apex was by now Harry T. Hanover. For 1922, the Guy engine was gone. The Model F "Pup" was added to the range, fitted with a conventional 4-cylinder Gray-Bell engine, and priced at $1295. It was sold beside the Model L "Scout" with a smaller than previous Hershell-Spillmann straight-six engine, and the new top-of-the-line Model C "Combat" with a 340 c.i. Continental Six engine. The sixes ranged in price from $2260 to $3150.

Most Ace cars were tourings, with a few roadsters, and a 4/5 passenger "Coupe-Sedan" with a custom-built look. The "Combat" line also included an attractive speedster in the Kissel Gold Bug pattern.

Apex was initially involved in the Diamond Cab project, which also included Gray Motor Corp., and Guy Disc Valve Motor Co. Within a few months, these plans became obsolete as Diamond Cab got new owners, resulting in the cab built by Elcar, and another cab built by the Driggs Ordnance & Manufacturing Corp.

Ace automobile production ended with the 1922 model year. Total production was 256 cars.
Apex Corp. was sold to the American Motor Truck Company in Newark, Ohio, in 1922. For a short time, Apex built bus bodies here, but soon closed forever.

Ace model overview 

The 1921 Model L and 1922 35-70 are mentioned by a single source. While the L appears a smaller companion to the Model H, the 35-70 possibly was nothing more than a renamed 1920 Model H Coupe-Sedan.

There is no existing Ace automobile known, however the Ypsilanti Automotive Heritage Museum offered a $5000 reward for evidence that directs to such a car. Although the museum continues to search for a surviving Ace, the reward expired in 2003 with the death of museum co-founder Skip Ungrodt.

See also
Vintage car

References

External links
Line drawing of 1921 Model G coupe
 american-automobiles.com: The Ace Automobile & The Apex Motor Corporation 
 ypsiautoheritage.org: Apex Motors 
 ypsilantihistoricalsociety.org: History / Ace Automobile - 1920-19 
 carfolio.com: Ace car specifications 
 carfolio.com: Specifications: 1921 Ace H 

Cars introduced in 1920
Motor vehicle manufacturers based in Michigan
Defunct motor vehicle manufacturers of the United States
Companies based in Washtenaw County, Michigan
Vehicle manufacturing companies established in 1920
American companies established in 1920
Vehicle manufacturing companies disestablished in 1923
1920 establishments in Michigan
1923 disestablishments in Michigan
Ypsilanti, Michigan
Defunct manufacturing companies based in Michigan